Psychiatric Genetics is a bimonthly medical journal published by Lippincott Williams & Wilkins within the field of psychiatric genetics. It is abstracted and indexed in MEDLINE/PubMed, BIOSIS Previews and the Science Citation Index Expanded. According to the Journal Citation Reports, the journal has a 2017 impact factor of 1.586.

See also

 List of psychiatry journals

References

External links 
 

Behavioural genetics journals
Psychiatry journals
Medical genetics journals
Lippincott Williams & Wilkins academic journals
Bimonthly journals
English-language journals
Publications established in 1990